Belhocine may refer to:

 Djaffar Belhocine (born 1961), Algerian handball player
 Karim Belhocine (born 1978), French footballer
 Mohamed Belhocine (born 1951), Algerian academician and epidemiologist
 Sarra Belhocine (born 1994), Algerian volleyball player

Arabic-language surnames